Schnitt Acht was an American EBM and industrial metal band from Orlando, Florida, active in the first half of the 1990s. The band's name is German for "cut eight", initially a translation error of "Section 8", "Abschnitt Acht" in German.

History
Formed in the late 1980s in Orlando, Florida by Morgan Lekcirt (born William Morgan Trickel), Virgil L. Hibbs, Abbot Zigler (born Christopher Lee) and later Jeff Paymaster, they signed in 1989 with DJ Magic Mike's Majii label that was part of the  Cheetah Record Company. Following several 12-inch singles, Schnitt Acht (alternately spelled SCHNITT Acht!) released their first album Subhuman Minds in 1990. It was followed in 1993 by Slash and Burn. Between 1991 and 1994 the band did a lot of touring, even performing in Europe and making tours in Germany and Romania. After their last tour in 1994, the band split up.

Virgil later started his own band WIRETRIPN, with which he self-released in 2001 the album Midnight in the Robot Factory via online retailer IUMA.

Paymaster, with Morgan, and Jan Herkach the techno/rave trio Radioactive Goldfish with whom he released "LSD Is the Bomb" which hit #8 of the Billboard Dance/Club Play Songs on March 14, 1992. Later he kept releasing as - among others - Rainbow Bridge and Gypsy Sun, worked as a producer in Florida and run the label Rainbow Bridge Records out of Orlando.

Discography
The discography consists of two studio albums and four twelve inches.

Subhuman Minds (1989/91)

Subhuman Minds (or with its subtitle Subhuman Minds on the Firing Line) was the band's first album, released on vinyl in 1990 by Cheetah's Majii label. It is electro-industrial and was licensed by Hyperium Records for a German release. For while, a CD release of the album was only available by the German label, but in 1991 Cheetah issued a Gold release for the North American market.

Track list
All songs are written and produced by Morgan Lekcirt.Published by C.H.R. Publishing.

Vinyl
Side 1

Side 2

Compact Disc
Act 1: The Fire of War

Act 2: This is Not a Dream

Credits
 Morgan Lekcirt - vocals, programming, percussion sampling & keyboards
 Virgil L. Hibbs - guitar percussion, backing vocals
 Abbot Zigler. - drums keyboards & percussion
 Jeff E. - drums & percussion
 Thomas R. Reich - executive producer & manager
 Jan Hrkach - recording, engineering, mixing & additional production
 Bob Ingra - mixing, additional production
 Mike Fuller - mastering
 DJ Magic Mike - mastering input

Singles
 1989 Subhuman Minds (12")
 1990 Fire (12")
 1991 Grouch (12")

Slash and Burn (1992/93)

With their second album Slash and Burn, released in 1993, they slowly moved into a more metal-influenced style, while trying to retain much that made their first album work. Originally release on Cheetah's Majii label, it was licensed by Hyperium for Germany and by Devotion Records for the U.K.

Track list
All songs are written and produced by Morgan Lekcirt.Published by C.H.R. Publishing.Sides are indicated, even on the compact disc release.

Side A

Side B

Credits
 Morgan Lekcirt - vocals, programming, beats & keyboards, mixing
 Virgil L. Hibbs - guitars, programming, backing vocals
 Abbot Zigler. - drums & percussion
 Thomas R. Reich - executive producer & manager

Single
 1992 Rage / Random Funk (CD / 12")

References

External links
 Schnitt Acht at Discogs
 Schnitt Acht at Last.fm
 Schnitt Acht Fan at MySpace
 Schnitt Acht discography at Rate Your Music
 Schnitt Acht videos and music on YouTube

American industrial metal musical groups
American electronic body music groups